The First Christian Church in Junction City, Kentucky is a historic Christian church at the junction of Shelby and Cemetery Streets.  It was built in 1932 and added to the National Register of Historic Places in 1998.

It was deemed notable " as a locally significant Period Revival interpretation of the early Christian Byzantine churches, with low massing and restrained ornament. It is of brick masonry with formed concrete basement foundation built on an "L" plan with intersecting gable roofs joined with a two-story vestibule/tower entry. Design details include large, stained glass, arch-headed windows centered in both gable ends above banks of stained glass sash windows, all trimmed with stone arches and lintels; corner buttresses with stone caps; stone coping at gable parapets; tower with wide eave overhang, shallow hip roof, louvered vents in the upper story and arch above the double door entry."

References

See also
National Register of Historic Places listings in Kentucky

Churches on the National Register of Historic Places in Kentucky
Churches completed in 1932
20th-century churches in the United States
Churches in Boyle County, Kentucky
National Register of Historic Places in Boyle County, Kentucky
1932 establishments in Kentucky
Byzantine Revival architecture in the United States